A marine mammal park (also known as marine animal park and sometimes oceanarium) is a commercial theme park or aquarium where marine mammals such as dolphins, beluga whales and sea lions are kept within water tanks and displayed to the public in special shows. A marine mammal park is more elaborate than a dolphinarium, because it also features other marine mammals and offers additional entertainment attractions. It is thus seen as a combination of a public aquarium and an amusement park. Marine mammal parks are different from marine parks, which include natural reserves and marine wildlife sanctuaries such as coral reefs, particularly in Australia.

History
Sea Lion Park opened in 1895 at Coney Island in Brooklyn, New York City with an aquatic show featuring 40 sea lions. It closed in 1903.

The second marine mammal park, then called an oceanarium, was established in St. Augustine, Florida in 1938. It was initially a large water tank used to exhibit marine mammals for filming underwater movies, and only became later a public attraction. Today Marineland of Florida claims to be "the world's first oceanarium".

In November 1961, Marineland of the Pacific on the Palos Verdes Peninsula, near Los Angeles in California was the first park to display an orca in captivity, although the orca died after two days.
The Vancouver Aquarium was responsible for the second orca ever held alive in captivity, Moby Doll, for 3 months in 1964.

Between the 1970s and the 1990s, technical advances and the public's increasing interest in aquatic environments prompted a shift to large marine mammal parks with cetaceans (mostly orcas and other species of dolphin) as attractions. Within this time SeaWorld USA emerged with operations in Orlando, Florida, San Diego, California, San Antonio, Texas, and Aurora, Ohio (which has since closed down).

List of parks

Asia

Australia

Europe

North America

South America

Criticism and animal welfare

Many animal welfare groups, such as the WSPA, consider keeping whales and dolphins in captivity a form of abuse. The main argument is that whales and dolphins do not have enough freedom of movement within their artificial environments. The existence of marine mammal parks is thus very controversially discussed.

Although sizable pools for whales and dolphins require an extraordinarily technical and financial expenditure and are usually nearly impossible to provide and maintain, many marine mammal parks endeavour to improve the conditions of captivity and attempt to engage in public education as well as scientific studies. For that purpose many marine mammal parks joined together in the "Alliance of Marine Mammal Parks and Aquariums", an international association dedicated to high standard of care of marine mammals. It was founded in 1987 and established offices near Washington, DC, in 1992. One report found that there is little objective evidence to indicate that marine mammal parks furthers public knowledge.

In 2010, the practice of keeping animals in captivity as trained show performers was heavily criticized when a trainer was killed by an orca whale at SeaWorld Orlando in Florida. Orcas attacks have been documented in the film Blackfish, released in 2013. In 2015, the California Coastal Commission banned the breeding of captive killer whales.

Books
Lou Jacobs, Wonders of an oceanarium: The story of marine life in captivity. Golden Gate Junior Books, 1965.
Joanne F. Oppenheim, Oceanarium. Bantam Books, 1994. 
Reed M. Swim with Dolphins Guide: A Guide to Wild Dolphin Swims, Dolphin Swim Resorts and Dolphin Assisted Therapy 2012.

See also
List of dolphinariums
WSPA

References

External links
Alliance of Marine Mammal Parks and Aquariums
Recommended EAAM dolphin housing standards
 Site sur les différents orques et leur mode de reproduction évitant la consanguinité. 

Animal welfare
Aquariums
Oceanaria
Amusement parks
Animal theme parks